Rawson C. Myrick (August 31, 1882—April 8, 1974) was a Vermont businessman and Republican politician who served as Secretary of State of Vermont for 20 years.

Biography
Rawson Clark Myrick was born in Bridport, Vermont on August 31, 1882, the son of Thadius J. and Alice (Fitch) Myrick.  He was educated in Bridport, and then taught school while also working on his father's farm.

He attended Burlington Business College, and then accepted a position on the staff of the U.S. Consulate in Three Rivers, Quebec.

Myrick returned to Vermont to work as the personal assistant to Norman S. Foote, a Middlebury real estate broker and property manager.  In 1906, he joined the staff of the Vermont Secretary of State.  He was promoted to Deputy Secretary of State in 1909, and served in this post until 1927.

In May, 1927, Secretary of State Aaron H. Grout resigned, and Governor John E. Weeks appointed Myrick to fill the vacancy.  He was elected to a full term in 1928, and was reelected nine times.  He served until September 1947, when he resigned.  He had already announced that he would not be a candidate for reelection in 1948 when he decided to leave office before the completion of his term as the result of a long period of ill health.  Myrick was succeeded by his deputy, Helen E. Burbank, who was appointed to fill the vacancy.  At 20 years, Myrick's tenure as Secretary of State is the longest in Vermont's history; George Nichols served for 19 years.

In retirement, Myrick resided in Montpelier.  He died at Porter Hospital in Middlebury on April 8, 1974, and was buried at Green Mount Cemetery in Montpelier.

Family
In 1914, Myrick married Florence Wheelock (1890-1918).  They were the parents of two daughters: Virginia (1915-1955), the wife of Stanley R. Sloan (1911-1975); and Florence (1918-2009), who was the wife of Edward Seager (1918-1985) of South Barre.

In 1925, Myrick married Hannah Dvorcef (1895-1982) of Montpelier.  Their son Rawson Jr. died in a 1978 car accident.

References

Sources

Books

Newspapers

1882 births
1974 deaths
People from Bridport, Vermont
Vermont Republicans
Secretaries of State of Vermont
Burials at Green Mount Cemetery (Montpelier, Vermont)